The Springfield Township School District is a community public school district that serves students in pre-kindergarten through sixth grade from Springfield Township in Burlington County, New Jersey, United States.

As of the 2018–19 school year, the district, comprising one school, had an enrollment of 226 students and 22.7 classroom teachers (on an FTE basis), for a student–teacher ratio of 10.0:1.

The district is classified by the New Jersey Department of Education as being in District Factor Group "FG", the fourth-highest of eight groupings. District Factor Groups organize districts statewide to allow comparison by common socioeconomic characteristics of the local districts. From lowest socioeconomic status to highest, the categories are A, B, CD, DE, FG, GH, I and J.

Public school students in seventh through twelfth grades attend the schools of the Northern Burlington County Regional School District, which also serves students from Chesterfield Township, Mansfield Township, North Hanover Township, along with children of military personnel based at Joint Base McGuire–Dix–Lakehurst. As of the 2018–19 school year, the high school district, comprising two schools, had an enrollment of 2,190 students and 163.4 classroom teachers (on an FTE basis), for a student–teacher ratio of 13.4:1. The schools in the district (with 2018–19 enrollment data from the National Center for Education Statistics) are 
Northern Burlington County Regional Middle School with 811 students in grades 7 - 8 and 
Northern Burlington County Regional High School with 1,348 students in grades 9-12. Both schools are in the Columbus section of Mansfield Township. Using a formula that reflects the population and the value of the assessed property in each of the constituent municipalities, taxpayers in Springfield Township pay 17.7% of the district's tax levy, with the district's 2013-14 budget including $35.6 million in spending.

School
Springfield Township School had an enrollment of 225 students in grades PreK-6 as of the 2018–19 school year.

Administration
Core members of the district's administration are:
Craig Vaughn, Superintendent
David Gorski, Business Administrator / Board Secretary

Board of education
The district's board of education, with nine members, sets policy and oversees the fiscal and educational operation of the district through its administration. As a Type II school district, the board's trustees are elected directly by voters to serve three-year terms of office on a staggered basis, with three seats up for election each year held (since 2012) as part of the November general election. The board appoints a superintendent to oversee the day-to-day operation of the district.

References

External links
Springfield Township School

Data for Springfield Township School District, National Center for Education Statistics
Northern Burlington County Regional School District

Springfield Township, Burlington County, New Jersey
New Jersey District Factor Group FG
School districts in Burlington County, New Jersey
Public elementary schools in New Jersey